The Catholic University of America's intercollegiate sports teams are called the Cardinals (after the bird northern cardinal), and they compete in the NCAA's Division III. They are members of the Landmark Conference, the New England Women's and Men's Athletic Conference (football) and the Mid-Atlantic Rowing Conference (rowing). The team colors are red (PMS 1805) and black.

Catholic celebrates Homecoming in the fall to coincide with a home football game.

Origin
Originally known as the Red and Black after the colors they wore, Catholic University's athletes came to be known as the Cardinals (often the Flying Cardinals, occasionally the Fighting Cardinals) in the mid-1920s.

Varsity athletics

History 
From the founding of the NCAA in 1906 through 1955, institutions were not separated into competitive divisions, and CUA won a national championship in boxing (1938). The football team appeared in two major bowl games, the 1936 Orange Bowl, which they won, and the 1940 Sun Bowl, which they tied. David Bernstein won the national collegiate boxing championship at 115 pounds in 1938 and "Bingo" Stant, Jr. won the 1939 national championship at 165 pounds.
From 1956 through 1972, teams were classified into University Division (major college) and College Division (small college). The Cardinals competed in the latter. During that period, the men's basketball team classified for the 1964 post season tournament, and Keats Baugher won two national championships in men's swimming in 1965 (the 200 and 400-yard individual medley). 
NCAA re-organized into three divisions in 1973, and CUA opted for the Division II level during the 1973–76 seasons. CUA stayed as member of the Mason-Dixon Conference. Mark Robinson won two individual national championships in track & field (the 800 meters in 1974 and 1975).
In 1976, CUA moved to Division I, competing for five years (1976–81). As independent first, and as a member of the Colonial Athletic Association later (1979–1981). During that period, the baseball team played the 1977 NCAA Division I baseball tournament.
President Edmund Pellegrino decided to drop the athletic programs to Division III and Catholic finally moved in the academic year of 1981–82, joining the Old Dominion Athletic Conference. In 1989 Catholic became a charter member of the Capital Athletic Conference, leaving the conference in 2007 to join, again as a charter member, the Landmark Conference. During this period at Division III, the men's basketball team won the national championship in 2001, Carolyn Hughes captured the 800 meters national track & field championship in 1982, and Tom Caffrey the 1,500 meters in 1991.

Women's teams were established after women were admitted as undergraduate students in the 1950s, and a Women's Sports Department was established in 1959.  The Department originally offered dance lessons and ping-pong and badminton tournaments.  Jone Rastapkevicius was hired as the first coordinator of women’s sports in 1961.  She went on to become a coach and married fellow CUA coach Martin Dowd.  In the early part of her 50-year tenure, she worked to schedule games with other local colleges, thereby turning many of the intramural sports into “extramural” ones.  The Metropolitan Sports Association for Women (MISAW) was founded in the mid-1960s by CUA along with Trinity College, Georgetown, American University, and George Washington University.  It operated until the early 1970s.

Boxing 
As a team, CUA won the national title in 1938. Besides, two cardinals won individual championships: 
David Bernstein won the 1938 national championship in the 115-pound weight class.
"Bingo" Stant Jr. won the 1939 national championship in the 165-pound weight class.

The NCAA discontinued boxing in 1961.

Football 

The football team appeared in two major bowl games (the 1936 Orange Bowl, which they won and the 1940 Sun Bowl, which they tied). In the fall of 2008, already in Division III, the team went to the ECAC Southeast Bowl and defeated Johns Hopkins University 18–17 to give the Cards their first post season win since 1936.

The team made three consecutive trips to the Division III playoffs in the late 1990s.

Baseball 
The Catholic University Cardinals played the 1977 NCAA Division I baseball tournament after winning the ECAC District II championship.  The Cardinals have won the Landmark Conference Tournament in 2008, 2009, 2011, 2015, and 2018.

Basketball

Men's 

The 1943–44 men's basketball team won the Mason–Dixon Conference title and made the program's first trip to the NCAA tournament. The team played in Madison Square Garden, losing to Dartmouth and Temple. 

The 1963–64 season, Catholic played the NCAA College Division (Division II) Tournament at Hofstra, losing to Hofstra and Philadelphia. 

The men's basketball team won the 2001 NCAA Division III National Championship and was the only program in Division III to reach the Sweet Sixteen five consecutive seasons, from 1998–2002. They also reached the postseason in 1993, 1996, 2003, 2004, 2006, 2007, 2013, 2015, and 2016.

Women's 
The 2011–12 women's basketball team won the Landmark Conference title and made the program's first trip to the NCAA tournament. In 2013 they won their second straight Landmark Conference title and again received the LC's automatic berth into the NCAA tournament, repeating in 2015. In 2017 and 2022 they received an at-large bid.

Track & Field 
The track & field team has produced three individual national champions:
Mark Robinson won the NCAA Division II 800 meter outdoor championship in 1974 and 1975.
Carolyn Hughes won the national championship in the 800 meters at the 1982 NCAA Division III Track & Field Championships.
Tom Caffrey won the national championship in the 1500 meters at the 1991 Division III Track & Field Championships.

Swimming 
The men's swim team has won four Capitol Athletic Conference titles and three National Catholic Division III championships, while women's swimming has won a Catholic Division III title. The swimming program has two individual national titles as well:
Keats Baugher won the national college division (Division II) championship in the 200 and 400 individual medley in 1965.

Lacrosse

Men's 
The men's lacrosse team went to the NCAA tournament in 2015, 2016, 2021 and 2022 after winning the conference title.

Women's 
In 2008, the women's lacrosse team went undefeated in the inaugural year of the Landmark Conference and won the Conference post-season tournament, garnering a berth in the NCAA tournament for the first time in program history, and making it to the regional finals where they lost to Salisbury University. The team has won the Landmark Conference Tournament in 2008, 2009, 2010, 2011, 2012, 2014, 2015, 2016, 2017, 2018, 2019, 2021 and 2022.

Soccer

Men's 
The men's soccer team went to the NCAA tournament in 2009, 2010, 2013 (at-large bid), 2014, 2019, 2021 and 2022 (at-large bid).

Women's 
Women's soccer went undefeated in the CAC in 2005 and earned a berth in the NCAA tournament, repeating in 2009, 2014 and 2015 as LC champions.

Field Hockey 
The field hockey team advanced to the 2001 ECAC Southern Region championship game and won the ECAC title in 2010. In 2011 CUA won its first conference championship, which propelled the Cardinals to their first-ever NCAA Tournament. They won the conference title again in 2012, and 2013. In 2014, the team earned an at-large bid and a first round bye to big dance. In 2015 and 2022, they were again Landmark Conference champions.

Volleyball 
The volleyball team made its first NCAA tournament appearance in 2001 and followed it up in 2002.

Softball 
The softball team won its first and only Capital Athletic Conference title in 1994, and went on to become the ECAC Southern Region Champions in the same season.  In 2012 the Cardinals won the ECAC Southern Region Championship for the second time. In 2014 CUA won its first Landmark Conference championship, which propelled the Cardinals to their first-ever NCAA Tournament.

Golf

Men's 
The men's golf team went to the NCAA tournament in 2021 after winning the conference championship.

Women's 
The women's golf team went to the NCAA tournament in 2021 after winning the conference championship.

Club Sports 
Student-led club teams include rugby, ice hockey, lacrosse, and sailing.

Rugby 
The Men's Rugby team competes in the Potomac Rugby Conference of the NSCRO.
The Women's Rugby team competes in the Capital Rugby Union (Central Division) of the NSCRO and was runner-up at the 2018 NSCRO Women's National Championship.

Ice Hockey 
The Ice Hockey team competes in the Delaware Valley Collegiate Hockey Conference (DVCHC) of the ACHA and plays at the Fort Dupont Ice Arena in Washington, D.C. The team went 13–0–0 during the 2014–15 season and went on to win the Blue Ridge Hockey Conference (BRHC) Championship in a 5–4 victory against the Maryland Terrapins. In 2017 the team transferred to the DVCHC. On February 10, 2019, the Cardinals secured an 11–5 victory at York College to win the 2018 Championship. They went 15–3–0 that season.

Lacrosse 
The Men's Club Lacrosse team competes in Division 2 of the Chesapeake Conference in the National College Lacrosse League. The team has secured the NCLL Division 2 National Championship for 2015, 2016, and 2017.

Sailing 
The Sailing team was founded in 1949 by the famous sailors Donald M Street Jr., Ed Rogers, and Boomer Curran. The team competes in the Middle Atlantic Intercollegiate Sailing Association of the ICSA.

Facilities 
Raymond A. DuFour Athletic Center (Offices)
Cardinal Stadium (Washington, D.C.) (FB, FH)
Franny Murray Court (MBB, WBB, VB)
Carlini Field (MSOC, WSOC, MLAX, WLAX)
DuFour Center Pool (MSWIM, WSWIM)
Robert J. Talbot Field (Baseball)
Softball Field
Dowd Family Tennis Courts (MTEN, WTEN)
Hanley Family Weight Room

Rivalries 
An important rivalry in Cardinals' history has been the football game against the Georgetown Hoyas, where the Steven Dean Memorial Trophy is in dispute. The series started at Brookland Stadium in 1976. 

Since 2022, the Pope's Cup is in dispute in all sports against Marymount University

Songs

Alma mater songs 
The official Alma Mater Song was adopted in 1920, when students organized a contest for an alma mater song, open to the then all-male student body. The winner was Hail CUA (lyrics by Robert H. Mahoney and music by Victor Herbert), but second-place winner Guardian of Truth (music and lyrics by Thomas J. McLean) became more popular over the years.

Fight song 
The cardinal's fight song is C.U. Marching Song (1931): (Music by Michael J. MacDonald & Lyrics by Clement Ducy)

Sing a song of C.U.A. for all the world to hear,
Drink a toast to Alma Mater, praise her far and near,
Make a vow you'll e'er be true and do what she taught right,
Whether we win or whether we lose, we'll never give up the fight,
Down the field the men in red and black go marching on
To victory, to victory,
Driving all before them in the struggle toward the goal
Of victory, of victory.
Onward we're marching with all our might,
Marching for C.U. never yielding, ever cheering, FIGHT!
Forever onward we're marching to victory,
For the Red and Black is winning
For C.U.A. it's Fight, Fight, Fight.
Crimson and Black are above all the rest.
Always a shout and a cheer, FIGHT!
Always our colors stand out with the best,
Onward forever against any odds,
Bringing the victory near.

CUA songs and cheers 
Students supporting the games in the early 1900s created the following songs and chants to inspire high spirits:

CUA (CU Will Shine) 
On, CUA, we’re rooting for you
And we know you’ll win today,
So battle hard, whatever befall you
For the name of CUA (Rah-Rah)
Go down the field,
And cross the goal line
With that CU pep and fight,
And when the grand old game is over,
CUA will shine tonight.
CU will shine tonight
CU will shine,
CU will shine tonight,
All down the line.
CU will shine tonight,
CU will shine,
When the sun goes down and the moon comes up,
CU will shine.

Drink a Highball 
Drink a highball at nightfall,
Be good fellows while you may,
For tomorrow may bring sorrow,
So tonight let’s all be gay,
Tell the story of the glory,
Of the Catholic University,
Drink a highball,
Let’s be jolly --
Here’s the health of CUA.

Flying Cardinals 
Fight Hard, Hit Hard, Buck that line!
Every man must do his part for victory!
For the honor of the red and black,
We stand behind the fighting varsity!
With our colors proudly flying high,
We will march today to victories new!
We all will back you to the limit,
Fight hard every minute,
Victory come to old CU.
Give three cheers for CU!
RAH RAH
Let us banish fear for vict’ry!
RAH RAH RAH
Everybody up!
Everybody shout
To our fighting boys of CUA!
We cheer, boys!

National team championships

Division I 
 Boxing: 1938 (unofficial)

Division III 
 Men's basketball: 2001

Notable athletes 
Brian Cashman, B.A. 1989, Senior Vice-President and General Manager, New York Yankees
Edward Lynch, LL.B. 1924, featured at Ripley's Believe It or Not! for making 98 tackles in a single football game.
Jimmy Patsos, B.A. 1989, men's basketball head coach, Siena Saints men's basketball
Wally Pipp, A.B. 1914, first base, New York Yankees
Rocco Pirro, football fullback who played for the Pittsburgh Steelers.

References

External links